The SNCF Class C 61000 (+ TC 61100)  diesel shunters were built by Compagnie Electro-Méchanique (CEM) between 1950–1953. 48 locomotives were built, numbered C 61001–61048. They were used for heavy shunting duties around Le Havre.

Two traction motors were fitted to the two end axles, all the axles being coupled by coupling rods.

Slave units
In addition, twelve slave units, numbered TC 61101-61112 were built, to provide extra power. These slave units did not have a cab, thus reducing their weight.

Disposal
These locomotive have now been withdrawn from SNCF service. However, several have been preserved, and a few were sold to for further use with industry or the Paris Metro operator RATP.

References

61000 1
CEM locomotives
C locomotives
C 61000
Railway locomotives introduced in 1950
Standard gauge locomotives of France

Shunting locomotives